Lists of women One Day International cricketers are lists of women's One Day International cricket players by team.

 List of Australia women ODI cricketers
 List of Bangladesh women ODI cricketers
 List of Denmark women ODI cricketers
 List of England women ODI cricketers
 List of India women ODI cricketers
 List of International XI women ODI cricketers
 List of Ireland women ODI cricketers
 List of Jamaica women ODI cricketers
 List of Japan women ODI cricketers
 List of Netherlands women ODI cricketers
 List of New Zealand women ODI cricketers
 List of Pakistan women ODI cricketers
 List of Scotland women ODI cricketers
 List of South Africa women ODI cricketers
 List of Sri Lanka women ODI cricketers
 List of Trinidad and Tobago women ODI cricketers
 List of West Indies women ODI cricketers
 List of Young England women ODI cricketers
 List of Zimbabwe women ODI cricketers

See also
 Lists of women Test cricketers
 Lists of women Twenty20 International cricketers